The  is an art museum founded in 1978. It is located in the Hiroshima Central Park in Hiroshima, Japan.

Collections

Gallery 1
From Romanticism to Impressionism

Gallery 2
Neo-Impressionists and Post-Impressionists

Gallery 3
Fauvism and Picasso

Gallery 4
Ecole de Paris

Gallery 5-8
Modern Japanese Paintings of Western-Style

Access
Astram Line Kencho-mae Station
Hiroden Kamiya-cho-higashi Station
Hiroden Kamiya-cho-nishi Station
Hiroshima Bus Center

See also
Hiroshima Prefectural Art Museum
Hiroshima City Museum of Contemporary Art

External links

Art museums and galleries in Japan
Museums in Hiroshima
Art museums established in 1978
1978 establishments in Japan